Path 62 or the Eldorado - McCullough 500 kV Line is a short  500 kV power line linking Los Angeles Department of Water and Power's (LADWP's) McCullough substation to Southern California Edison's (SCE's) Eldorado substation in the Eldorado - Marketplace - McCullough substation complex just south of Boulder City, Nevada. Path 62 is part of The Western Electricity Coordinating Council's links of electrical intertie paths in the western United States. Like Path 61, this short, yet important 500 kV line allows for power flow to be rerouted on different 500 kV lines that make up the massive Path 46 transmission system when necessary. Power generated from Hoover Dam, and fossil fuel power plants in the Four Corners region is routed to this substation complex via many other 500 kV lines that connect to this substation complex.

Power transmission capacity
The 500 kV line can transmit 2,598 MVA (3,000 amps) of electrical power in either direction.

References

Western Interconnection
Energy infrastructure in Nevada